

Before 1910
 1897 - The Captain and the Kids is created by Rudolph Dirks and debuted December 12, 1897.
 1900 – J. Stuart Blackton and Thomas Edison create The Enchanted Drawing, the first film to feature groundbreaking animated sequences.
 1908 – Fantasmagorie, considered by animation historians as the world's first cartoon, is released.

1910s
 1911 – Little Nemo
 1912 –
 1913 –
 1914 – Gertie the Dinosaur
 1915 –
 1916 –
 1917 – El Apóstol (the first full-length animated feature film)
 1918
 1919 – Felix the Cat debuts.

1920s
 1920 – 
 1921 – Fleischer Studios is founded
 1922 –
 1923 – Walt Disney Animation Studios is founded.
 1924 – 
 1925 –
 1926 – The Adventures of Prince Achmed 
 1927 – First appearance of Oswald the Lucky Rabbit in Trolley Troubles. He appears in Poor Papa, which is made earlier in 1927, but it is rejected by Universal Pictures and not released until 1928. 
 1928 – Mickey Mouse makes his first appearance in Steamboat Willie, the first ever synchronized cartoon with sound.
 1929 – Silly Symphonies, Talkartoons, Aesop's Fables

1930s
 1930 – Looney Tunes, Betty Boop; Warner Bros. Animation is founded.
 1931 – Merrie Melodies, Toby the Pup, Flip the Frog
 1932 – Silly Symphony cartoon Flowers and Trees becomes the first cartoon in colour and first Academy Award for Best Animated Short Film; Puppetoons.
 1933 – Popeye the Sailor, Father Noah's Ark, Three Little Pigs
 1934 – Donald Duck
 1935 – 
 1936 – Three Blind Mouseketeers, Kiko the Kangaroo, Moving Day
 1937 – Snow White and the Seven Dwarfs (the first American full-length animated feature film)
 1938 – 
 1939 – Ugly Duckling, Gulliver's Travels; National Film Board of Canada is founded.

1940s
 1940 – Tom and Jerry, Pinocchio, Fantasia
 1941 – Woody Woodpecker, Raggedy Ann and Andy, Dumbo, Superman, Princess Iron Fan, Mr. Bug Goes to Town
 1942 – Bambi, Mighty Mouse, Saludos Amigos, How to Play Baseball
 1943 – Red Hot Riding Hood, Little Lulu, Victory Through Air Power
 1944 – The Three Caballeros, Screwball Squirrel
 1945 – Casper the Friendly Ghost
 1946 – Make Mine Music, Heckle and Jeckle
 1947 – Fun and Fancy Free, The Crab with the Golden Claws, Slap Happy Lion
 1948 – Melody Time, Little Tinker, Animaland
 1949 – The Adventures of Ichabod and Mr. Toad, Mr. Magoo, Crusader Rabbit (the first ever animated television series)

1950s
 1950 – Cinderella, Gerald McBoing-Boing
 1951 – Alice in Wonderland
 1952 – Tony the Tiger (Kellogg's Frosted Flakes), The Scarlet Flower, The Snow Maiden, Lambert the Sheepish Lion, The Curious Adventures of Mr. Wonderbird
 1953 – Peter Pan, Chilly Willy
 1954 – Animal Farm
 1955 – Lady and the Tramp (becoming the first animated film to be filmed in CinemaScope)
1956 - The Gumby Show, The Twelve Months; Toei Animation is founded.
 1957 – Let's All Go to the Lobby, The Snow Queen, Hergé's Adventures of Tintin; Hanna-Barbera is founded, followed by the first broadcast of its first show, The Ruff and Reddy Show.
 1958 – The Huckleberry Hound Show, The White Snake Enchantress
 1959 – Rocky and Bullwinkle and Friends, Sleeping Beauty, 1001 Arabian Nights, The Quick Draw McGraw Show

1960s
 1960 – The Flintstones, The Bugs Bunny Show, Goliath II
 1961 – One Hundred and One Dalmatians, The Alvin Show, Top Cat, Surogat, The Yogi Bear Show
 1962 – The Jetsons, Gay Purr-ee, The Hanna-Barbera New Cartoon Series, Wally Gator
 1963 – Astro Boy (the first ever anime television series), The Sword in the Stone
 1964 – The Pink Panther cartoon series, Hoppity Hooper, Jonny Quest, Underdog, The Magilla Gorilla Show, Rudolph the Red-Nosed Reindeer
 1965 – A Charlie Brown Christmas (first Peanuts TV special), The Magic Roundabout, The Atom Ant/Secret Squirrel Show, The New 3 Stooges, The Dot and the Line
 1966 – Winnie the Pooh featurettes, Space Ghost, Trumptonshire trilogy, Ultra Series, How the Grinch Stole Christmas!, Kimba the White Lion anime series, Arthur! and the Square Knights of the Round Table
 1967 – The Jungle Book, Asterix, George of the Jungle, Speed Racer, Spider-Man
 1968 – Yellow Submarine, Wacky Races, The Herbs, The Archie Show, The Little Drummer Boy
 1969 – Scooby-Doo, Where Are You!, The Perils of Penelope Pitstop, Dastardly and Muttley in Their Flying Machines, The Wonderful World of Puss 'n Boots, Nu, pogodi!, Clangers, Moomin, Hey, Hey, Hey, It's Fat Albert, Frosty the Snowman, It's Tough to Be a Bird; The Archies release "Sugar, Sugar".

1970s
 1970 – The Aristocats, Broom-Hilda, The Phantom Tollbooth, Josie and the Pussycats, Santa Claus Is Comin' to Town
 1971 – Mr Benn, Here Comes Peter Cottontail, La Linea
 1972 – Fritz the Cat (bringing in the age of adult animation), The Amazing Chan and the Chan Clan, Fat Albert and the Cosby Kids, Calimero; Aardman is founded; the 1st Annie Awards are awarded.
 1973 – Schoolhouse Rock!, The Wombles, Heavy Traffic, Star Trek: The Animated Series, Charley Says, Robin Hood, Charlotte's Web, Fantastic Planet
 1974 – Roobarb, Hong Kong Phooey, Bagpuss, Mio Mao, Heidi, Girl of the Alps, Closed Mondays
 1975 – Paddington Bear, Tubby the Tuba, Great, Mr. Men, Hedgehog in the Fog, Hugo the Hippo, Bod, Ivor the Engine
 1976 – Dynomutt, Dog Wonder, Chorlton and the Wheelies, Noah and Nelly in... SkylArk, Monica and Friends, Allegro Non Troppo
 1977 – The Many Adventures of Winnie the Pooh, Morph, Wizards, The Rescuers, Baggy Pants and the Nitwits, Captain Caveman and the Teen Angels, The Hobbit, Raggedy Ann & Andy: A Musical Adventure, Dot and the Kangaroo, The Flumps
 1978 – Watership Down (first animated feature film to be presented in Dolby Stereo), Future Boy Conan, The Lord of the Rings, Ringing Bell, Galaxy Express 999, Battle of the Planets, The Fabulous Funnies, Special Delivery
 1979 – Tale of Tales, Banjo the Woodpile Cat, The Castle of Cagliostro, Anne of Green Gables, Nutcracker Fantasy, Mobile Suit Gundam

1980s
 1980 – The Amazing Adventures of Morph, Strawberry Shortcake, Heathcliff
 1981 – The Smurfs, Danger Mouse (1981), Postman Pat, American Pop, Heavy Metal, The Fox and the Hound, Willo the Wisp, Dogtanian and the Three Muskehounds
 1982 – The Secret of NIMH, The Snowman, SuperTed, The Last Unicorn, Monica and Friends, Super Dimension Fortress Macross, The Mysterious Cities of Gold, The Plague Dogs, Hey Good Lookin', Ziggy's Gift, Les Maîtres du temps
 1983 – He-Man and the Masters of the Universe, G.I. Joe: A Real American Hero, Alvin and the Chipmunks, Golgo 13: The Professional, The Wind in the Willows, Crusher Joe, Inspector Gadget, Henry's Cat, Bananaman, Rock & Rule (first animated feature film to use Computer graphics), Fire and Ice, Nanako SOS, Mickey's Christmas Carol, Twice Upon a Time, Chronopolis, Creamy Mami, the Magic Angel, Dallos (first animated production released exclusively on direct-to-video)
 1984 – The Transformers, Nausicaä of the Valley of the Wind, Gallavants, Fist of the North Star, Voltron, Rainbow Brite, The Family-Ness, Thomas the Tank Engine and Friends, The Trap Door, Rupert and the Frog Song, Muppet Babies, Lensman
 1985 – ThunderCats, The Raccoons, Disney's Adventures of the Gummi Bears, M.A.S.K., Jem, The Black Cauldron; Studio Ghibli is founded 
 1986 – Dragon Ball, Footrot Flats: The Dog's Tale, An American Tail, Castle in the Sky, The Transformers: The Movie, The Great Mouse Detective, The Real Ghostbusters, The Raggy Dolls, When the Wind Blows, Pingu; Pixar is founded, along with its first short film Luxo Jr., A Greek Tragedy
 1987 – Teenage Mutant Ninja Turtles, DuckTales, Fireman Sam, The Adventures of Spot, ALF: The Animated Series, Beverly Hills Teens, Royal Space Force: The Wings of Honnêamise, Once Upon a Time... Life, The Chipmunk Adventure, The Brave Little Toaster, Bubblegum Crisis, Gandahar; Blue Sky Studios is Founded
 1988 – Who Framed Roger Rabbit, My Neighbor Totoro, Akira, The Land Before Time, Charlie Chalk, Count Duckula, Charlie Chalk, Grave of the Fireflies, Tin Toy, Oliver & Company, Garfield and Friends, City Hunter, Alice, Technological Threat, Fantastic Max
 1989 – The Simpsons, Wallace and Gromit, The Little Mermaid (starting off the Disney Renaissance), The BFG, Chip 'n Dale: Rescue Rangers, Babar, Beetlejuice, Ranma ½, Kiki's Delivery Service, Creature Comforts, All Dogs Go to Heaven, Muzzy, Little Nemo: Adventures in Slumberland, Jungle Book Shōnen Mowgli, Happily Ever After

1990s
 1990 – The Rescuers Down Under, Captain Planet and the Planeteers, Tiny Toon Adventures, TaleSpin, Bobby's World; Nickelodeon Animation is founded
 1991 – Beauty and the Beast, Rock-a-Doodle, the first three Nicktoons (Doug, Rugrats and The Ren & Stimpy Show), Darkwing Duck, Only Yesterday, Æon Flux, A Bunch of Munsch
 1992 – Batman: The Animated Series, Sailor Moon, Aladdin, The World of Peter Rabbit and Friends, Shakespeare: The Animated Tales, Eek! the Cat, FernGully: The Last Rainforest, X-Men, Crayon Shin-Chan, Porco Rosso, Yu Yu Hakusho; Cartoon Network is launched
 1993 – The Nightmare Before Christmas, Animaniacs,Maimai Medenes Goes To The Moon,Beavis and Butt-Head, The Animals of Farthing Wood, Batman: Mask of the Phantasm, VeggieTales, 2 Stupid Dogs, Family Dog, The Thief and the Cobbler, Rocko's Modern Life, Madeline, The Adventures of Sonic the Hedgehog, Sonic the Hedgehog, Biker Mice From Mars, Bob's Birthday
 1994 – The Lion King, Thumbelina, The Swan Princess, The Tick, Spider-Man, Duckman, Pom Poko, ReBoot, Magic Adventures of Mumfie, Gargoyles, Space Ghost Coast to Coast, Bump in the Night, The Magic School Bus, Aaahh!!! Real Monsters; DreamWorks Animation is founded
 1995 – Toy Story, Pinky and the Brain, Freakazoid!, Ghost in the Shell, M&M's Spokescandies, Neon Genesis Evangelion, Whisper of the Heart, The Critic, The Pebble and the Penguin, Pocahontas, Wolves, Witches and Giants
 1996 – Dexter's Laboratory, Hey Arnold!, James and the Giant Peach, Blue's Clues, Space Jam, Arthur, KaBlam!, Superman: The Animated Series, The Hunchback of Notre Dame
 1997 – South Park, Pokémon, Princess Mononoke, Anastasia, Todd MacFarlane's Spawn, The Old Lady and the Pigeons, Johnny Bravo, King of the Hill, Daria, Hercules, Cow and Chicken, I Am Weasel, The Angry Beavers, Cats Don't Dance, Space Goofs, Recess
 1998 – The Powerpuff Girls, Mulan, Cowboy Bepop, Oggy and the Cockroaches, Kirikou and the Sorceress, Oh Yeah! Cartoons, The Wild Thornberrys, Quest for Camelot, A Bug's Life, The Prince of Egypt, CatDog, Bunny, Bob the Builder, Bob and Margaret
 1999 – SpongeBob SquarePants, The Iron Giant, Family Guy, Futurama, One Piece, South Park: Bigger, Longer & Uncut, My Neighbours the Yamadas, Tarzan (final Disney Renaissance film), Toy Story 2, Fantasia 2000, Digimon: Digital Monsters, Happy Tree Friends, Ed, Edd 'n Eddy, Batman Beyond, Home Movies, Olive the Other Reindeer, Robbie the Reindeer, Courage the Cowardly Dog, Rocket Power, The Old Man and the Sea, Dilbert, Mike, Lu and Og

2000s
 2000 – Dora the Explorer, 3-2-1 Penguins!, Chicken Run, Titan A.E., Aqua Teen Hunger Force, Static Shock, As Told By Ginger, Teacher's Pet, Harvey Birdman, Attorney at Law, The Emperor's New Groove, The Road to El Dorado, For the Birds, Sheep in the Big City, Dinosaur
 2001 – Shrek (which wins the first ever Academy Award for Best Animated Feature), The Fairly OddParents, Invader Zim, Samurai Jack, Spirited Away, The Grim Adventures of Billy & Mandy, House of Mouse, Oswald,Time Squad, El Nombre, Monsters, Inc., Waking Life, Lloyd in Space, Justice League, Yu-Gi-Oh!, The Proud Family, Atlantis: The Lost Empire, Metropolis, Stanley,Totally Spies!, Beyblade, Tootuff, Osmosis Jones (2001 film); Gorillaz release their self-titled debut album; Cartoon Network launches Adult Swim.
 2002 – Lilo & Stitch, Ice Age, The Adventures of Jimmy Neutron: Boy Genius, Whatever Happened to... Robot Jones?, Cyberchase, A Town Called Panic (TV series), Filmore!, Clone High, Spirit: Stallion of the Cimarron, ChalkZone, ¡Mucha Lucha!, Kim Possible, Treasure Planet, The ChubbChubbs!, Codename: Kids Next Door
 2003 – Finding Nemo, The Triplets of Belleville, Teen Titans, Xiaolin Showdown, My Life as a Teenage Robot, Brother Bear, Tokyo Godfathers, Creature Comforts (TV series), The Venture Bros., Harvie Krumpet, Making Fiends, Jojo's Circus, Code Lyoko, Crazy Frog, The Jungle Book 2, Looney Tunes: Back in Action, Watch My Chops
 2004 – The Incredibles, Foster's Home for Imaginary Friends, Drawn Together, Shrek 2, Shark Tale, Howl's Moving Castle, The Polar Express, Bleach, Atomic Betty, Peppa Pig, Hi Hi Puffy AmiYumi, Danny Phantom, The Backyardigans, Home on the Range, Super Robot Monkey Team Hyperforce Go!, Winx Club, Brandy and Mr. Whiskers, W.I.T.C.H., Shorties Watchin' Shorties
 2005 – Avatar: The Last Airbender, Ben 10, Wallace and Gromit: The Curse of the Were-Rabbit, Corpse Bride, American Dad!, Robots, Robot Chicken, Chicken Little, Madagascar,The X's, 9, The Boondocks, 12 oz. Mouse, Camp Lazlo, Charlie and Lola, Squidbillies, Pleasant Goat and Big Big Wolf, American Dragon: Jake Long, The Buzz on Maggie, Being Ian, The Life and Times of Juniper Lee, My Gym Partner's A Monkey, Johnny Test, Catscratch; Gorillaz release Demon Days; Laika is founded.
 2006 – Happy Feet, Death Note, Yin Yang Yo!, Curious George, Cars, Monster House, Wonder Pets!, Wow! Wow! Wubbzy!, Squirrel Boy, Class of 3000, The Emperor's New School, The Replacements, Shorty McShorts' Shorts, Over the Hedge, Flushed Away, Ice Age: The Meltdown, Code Geass, Pucca, Peter and the Wolf, The Girl Who Leapt Through Time, The Danish Poet, Paprika, Open Season, Minuscule 2007 – Phineas and Ferb, Ratatouille, Ricky Sprocket: Showbiz Boy, The Simpsons Movie, Total Drama, Meet the Robinsons, Chowder, Persepolis, Surf's Up, WordGirl, El Tigre: The Adventures of Manny Rivera, Shaun the Sheep; Chris Meledandri leaves 20th Century Fox Animation to form his own company Illumination
 2008 – Kung Fu Panda, Ponyo, The Mr. Men Show, Star Wars: The Clone Wars, Chuggington, WALL-E, Waltz with Bashir, The Marvelous Misadventures of Flapjack, Kid vs. Kat, Batman: The Brave and the Bold, Tinker Bell, Bolt, Horton Hears a Who!, The Mighty B!, Simon's Cat, Sita Sings the Blues 2009 – Coraline, Up, Fantastic Mr. Fox, The Princess and the Frog, Ice Age: Dawn of the Dinosaurs, Mary and Max, Cloudy with a Chance of Meatballs, Prep & Landing, Archer, A Town Called Panic (film), Monsters Vs. Aliens, Logorama, Summer Wars, The Secret of Kells, Compare the Meerkat, Logorama, The Gruffalo2010s
 2010 – Adventure Time, How to Train Your Dragon, My Little Pony: Friendship Is Magic, Despicable Me, Toy Story 3, Tangled, The Ricky Gervais Show, The Illusionist, Chico and Rita, A Cat in Paris, Regular Show, Young Justice; Gorillaz release Plastic Beach and The Fall 
 2011 – Bob's Burgers, The Adventures of Tintin, Rango, The Amazing World of Gumball, Arthur Christmas, Rio, Puss in Boots, The Fantastic Flying Books of Mr. Morris Lessmore, Secret Mountain Fort Awesome 2012 – Gravity Falls, ParaNorman, The Legend of Korra, Brave, Wreck-It Ralph, Hotel Transylvania, Teenage Mutant Ninja Turtles (2012), Daniel Tiger's Neighbourhood, Paperman, Dumb Ways to Die 2013 – Frozen, Rick and Morty, Attack on Titan, Epic, Sanjay and Craig, The Wind Rises, Steven Universe, The Croods, Teen Titans Go!, The Tale of Princess Kaguya, Boy and the World, PAW Patrol, Uncle Grandpa 2014 – The Lego Movie, BoJack Horseman, Over the Garden Wall, Big Hero 6, The Book of Life, The Boxtrolls, Star Wars Rebels, When Marnie Was There, Tumble Leaf, Song of the Sea 2015 – Inside Out, Shaun the Sheep Movie, Star vs. the Forces of Evil, F Is for Family, Minions, Miraculous: Tales of Ladybug & Cat Noir, We Bare Bears, Supernoobs, Anomalisa, The Little Prince 
 2016 – Zootopia, The Haunted House, The Loud House, Moana, The Secret Life of Pets, Your Name, Kubo and the Two Strings, Milo Murphy's Law, Trolls, My Hero Academia, Tales of Arcadia, The Red Turtle, Piper, A Silent Voice, My Life as a Courgette, Voltron: Legendary Defender; Steve Cutts releases Moby's Are You Lost In The World Like Me? 2017 – The Emoji Movie, Lucas the Spider, DuckTales (2017), Coco, Castlevania, The Breadwinner, In a Heartbeat, Big Mouth, Loving Vincent, Hanazuki: Full of Treasures, The Boss Baby, Ferdinand; Gorillaz release Humanz 2018 – Spider-Man: Into the Spider-Verse, Incredibles 2, Isle of Dogs, Bluey, Hilda, The Dragon Prince, Disenchantment, Summer Camp Island, Mirai, Final Space, Dragon Ball Super: Broly, Craig of the Creek, She-Ra and the Princesses of Power, Early Man; Gorillaz release The Now Now 2019 – Frozen II, Harley Quinn, SparkShorts, Infinity Train, Amphibia, Abominable, Green Eggs and Ham, Weathering with You, DC Super Hero Girls, The Casagrandes, Carmen Sandiego, Blue's Clues & You!, Undone, Hair Love, I Lost My Body, Missing Link, Klaus, Toy Story 4, Spies In Disguise, Primal, Demon Slayer; Kyoto Animation's first studio becomes the victim of an arson attack that kills 35 people

2020s
 2020 – Wolfwalkers, The Owl House, Short Circuit, Onward, Soul, Central Park, Close Enough, Solar Opposites, Over the Moon, YOLO; Gorillaz release Song Machine 2021 – The Mitchells vs. the Machines, Invincible, Encanto, Marcel the Shell with Shoes On, MeTV's Toon In With Me, What If...? (as part of the Marvel Cinematic Universe's series of shows for Disney+), Raya and the Last Dragon, Luca, Vivo, HouseBroken, The Boss Baby: Family Business, Robin Robin, The Ghost and Molly McGee2022 – Guillermo del Toro's Pinocchio, Smiling Friends, Turning Red, Chip 'n Dale: Rescue Rangers (2022 film), The Cuphead Show!, DC League of Superpets, Wendell & Wild, Hamster & Gretel, The Bad Guys, The Boy, the Mole, the Fox and the Horse2023 – Hazbin Hotel, Moon Girl and Devil Dinosaur,  The Super Mario Bros Movie, Gremlins: Secrets of the Mogwai, Elemental, Kiff, Tooned Out, Spider-Man: Across the Spider-Verse, Digman!''

See also
 History of animation
 Lists of animated television series
 List of years in anime

References

Culture-related timelines
Timelines by year
Animation by year
Lists of years by topic